The 2019–20 Georgia Lady Bulldogs basketball team represents the University of Georgia during the 2019–20 NCAA Division I women's basketball season. The Lady Bulldogs, led by fifth-year head coach Joni Taylor, play their home games at the Stegeman Coliseum and compete as members of the Southeastern Conference (SEC).

Preseason

SEC media poll
The SEC media poll was released on October 15, 2019.

Roster

Schedule

|-
!colspan=9 style=| Non-conference regular season

|-
!colspan=9 style=| SEC regular season

|-
!colspan=9 style=| SEC Tournament

References

Georgia Lady Bulldogs basketball seasons
Georgia
Georgia Lady Bulldogs
Georgia Lady Bulldogs